The Tracy Hills AVA is an American Viticultural Area located approximately  east-southeast from San Francisco in both San Joaquin County and Stanislaus County, California. The  region was designated an AVA as a result of a petition from the owners of Tulip Hill Winery in Lake County, who owned a vineyard on Mount Oso in the Tracy Hills. The best known wines from Tracy Hills vineyards are the range of Italian varietal wines produced by Jacuzzi Family Vineyards who are based in Sonoma. The sloping hillside topography includes streams and alluvial fans and plains. The distinguishing climatic features of the proposed area include limited rainfall and persistent winds, along with sparse fog, frost, and dew.

References

External links 
 Jacuzzi Family Vineyards

American Viticultural Areas
American Viticultural Areas of California
Geography of San Joaquin County, California
Geography of Stanislaus County, California
2006 establishments in California